Ruby Schleicher (born 16 March 1998) is an Australian rules footballer playing for the Collingwood Football Club in the AFL Women's (AFLW). Schleicher is a dual AFL Women's All-Australian.

Early life and state football
Before playing football, Schleicher played basketball and won the Smarter than Smoking Female Player of the Year award while playing with SBL team Willetton Tigers, She also represented the under-16 and the under-18 Western Australian Metropolitan teams. She was on the way to receiving a basketball scholarship at an American college, before breaking a vertebra playing and half-a-year later breaking one on the other side while surfing, which as a result of the college decided not to risk her.

In 2015, Schleicher was named in the Western Australian squad for the AFL Youth Girls National Championships. In 2016, she played with the WA Youth Girls team who made the Grand Final, before getting the opportunity to play senior football for her local WAWFL club East Fremantle. In her last game of the year she was the starting ruck for East Fremantle in the Grand Final.

In the winter during the off-season between the 2017 and 2018 AFLW seasons, Schleicher decided to stay in Melbourne and play in the VFLW with the St Kilda Sharks. She debuted with the St Kilda Sharks in their round 1 match against Eastern Devils, winning by one point.

AFL Women's career
She made her debut in round 1, 2017, in the inaugural AFLW match at IKON Park against .

Collingwood re-signed Schleicher for the 2018 season during the trade period in May 2017.

Collingwood re-signed Schleicher for the 2019 season during the trade period in June 2018.

In the 2021 AFL Women's season, Schleicher was awarded with her maiden All-Australian blazer, named on the half back position. It was revealed Schleicher had signed on with Collingwood for two years on 10 June 2021. Schleicher achieved selection in Champion Data's 2021 AFLW All-Star stats team, after leading the league for total intercept possessions and intercept marks in the 2021 season.

Statistics
Updated to the end of S7 (2022).

|-
| 2017 ||  || 18
| 5 || 0 || 0 || 9 || 6 || 15 || 0 || 15 || 0.0 || 0.0 || 1.8 || 1.2 || 3.0 || 0.0 || 3.0 || 0
|- 
| 2018 ||  || 18
| 5 || 0 || 0 || 14 || 6 || 20 || 6 || 9 || 0.0 || 0.0 || 2.8 || 1.2 || 4.0 || 1.2 || 1.8 || 0
|-
| 2019 ||  || 18
| 6 || 0 || 0 || 23 || 13 || 36 || 9 || 8 || 0.0 || 0.0 || 3.8 || 2.2 || 6.0 || 1.5 || 1.3 || 0
|- 
| 2020 ||  || 18
| 2 || 0 || 0 || 8 || 3 || 11 || 1 || 2 || 0.0 || 0.0 || 4.0 || 1.5 || 5.5 || 0.5 || 1.0 || 0
|-
| 2021 ||  || 18
| 11 || 2 || 0 || 115 || 62 || 177 || 46 || 29 || 0.2 || 0.0 || 10.5 || 5.6 || 16.1 || 4.2 || 2.6 || 2
|-
| 2022 ||  || 18
| 11 || 1 || 0 || 115 || 83 || 198 || 54 || 35 || 0.1 || 0.0 || 10.5 || 7.5 || 18.0 || 4.9 || 3.2 || 6
|-
| S7 (2022) ||  || 18
| 11 || 0 || 1 || 116 || 54 || 170 || 35 || 48 || 0.0 || 0.1 || 10.5 || 4.9 || 15.5 || 3.2 || 4.4 || 3
|- class=sortbottom
! colspan=3 | Career
! 51 !! 3 !! 1 !! 400 !! 227 !! 627 !! 151 !! 146 !! 0.1 !! 0.0 !! 7.8 !! 4.5 !! 12.3 !! 3.0 !! 2.9 !! 11
|}

Honours and achievements
 2× AFL Women's All-Australian team: 2021, 2022

References

External links

 
 
 

Living people
1998 births
Collingwood Football Club (AFLW) players
Australian rules footballers from Perth, Western Australia
Sportswomen from Western Australia